The Slingsby T.1/T.2 Falcon or British Falcon) was a single-seat sport glider produced, in 1931–37, by Fred Slingsby in Scarborough, Yorkshire.

Design and development
The Falcon was constructed from plans supplied by the Rhön-Rossitten Gesellschaft (the controlling body for gliding in Germany). Originally designed by Alexander Lippisch, the T.1 was a single-seat sport glider of moderate performance for its day. The fuselage was primarily of wooden construction with six longerons, built-up frames, plywood skinning forward of the central pylon and fabric covering aft. The parasol wings were conventional in design and construction with built-up ribs and spars, plywood covering forward of the main spars and fabric aft.  They were swept at 12.5o but carried ailerons with unswept hinges and rounded trailing edges.  The wings were built in two parts joined at the centre, supported by a pylon and a total of eight struts, four vertical from the top longerons and four in vee pairs from the bottom longerons to approx 1/3-span. The tail surfaces were constructed in a similar fashion also braced with struts.

History

Fred Slingsby had noticed the lack of 'Intermediate' gliders available in England. At the recommendation of Guenther Groenhoff he acquired the plans for Lippisch's Falke and built ten aircraft: the Falcon, Falcon 2 and eight further Falcons (a.k.a. British Falcon). These aircraft were flown successfully for many years, but gradually succumbed until none were left airworthy. One was exported to Canada, and one was converted to a flying-boat glider for use by the Air Training Corps on Windermere, surviving to this day in the Windermere Steamboat Museum. During 1984-5 Ken Fripp of Southdown Aero Services at Lasham built a reproduction Falcon from original plans for Mike Russell, bringing the total built to eleven.

Operators

Air Training Corps

Specifications

See also

References
 Ellison, N.H. British Gliders and Sailplanes 1922-1970. A & C Black, 1971
 Simons, M. Slingsby Sailplanes. Airlife Publishing, 1996 -

External links

1930s British sailplanes
Glider aircraft
Falcon
Aircraft first flown in 1931
Parasol-wing aircraft